Tamaz Namgalauri (25 September 1957 – 25 October 1991) was a Georgian judoka. He competed in the men's lightweight event at the 1980 Summer Olympics, representing the Soviet Union.

References

External links
 

1957 births
1991 deaths
Male judoka from Georgia (country)
Olympic judoka of the Soviet Union
Judoka at the 1980 Summer Olympics
Sportspeople from Tbilisi